Asai Man Piyabanna is a 2007 Sri Lankan Sinhala musical romantic film directed by Udayakantha Warnasuriya and produced by Dhammika Siriwardana for Alankulama Films. It stars Roshan Ranawana and Pooja Umashankar in lead roles along with Sanath Gunathilake and Upeksha Swarnamali. The music is composed by Rohana Weerasinghe.

The film was released in November 2007 and was a major commercial success in Sri Lanka in that year, as well as receiving positive reviews. It is a remake of the 1999 Bollywood film Taal starring Aishwarya Rai, Anil Kapoor and Akshay Khanna.

Cast
Roshan Ranawana as Praveen
Pooja Umashankar as Ranmalee / Maleesha
Gayathri Dias as Praveen's sister
Shiran Silva as Praveen's brother
Nalin Pradeep Udawela as Sarath 
Sanath Gunathilake as Sapumal Senadheera
Upeksha Swarnamali
Umali Thilakarathne as Pabalu

Production
The music video for Piyabanna Asai was filmed in Kandy, Sri Lanka.

Release
The film earned positive reviews and went on to become a major commercial success, further establishing Pooja Umashankar as a leading Sri Lankan actress.

Soundtrack
 Walakul Wiyan Thanala - Performed by Bathiya and Santhush with Umaria Sinhawansa
 Samanal Hanguman Athare - Performed by Uresha Ravihari 
 Pehasara Obe Adare - Performed By Centigradz
 Kasthuru Suwanda - Performed by Bathiya and Santhush with Sachith Peiris
 Hiru Meki Yai Neela Ahase - Performed By Amila Perera

References

2007 films
2000s Sinhala-language films
Remakes of Sri Lankan films
Films directed by Udayakantha Warnasuriya